Tinside Lido is a 1935 Art Deco lido in the city of Plymouth in south-west England.
It is sited beside Plymouth Sound and is overlooked by Plymouth Hoe and Smeaton's Tower. The lido is open in the summer months between May and September.

History
The lido was designed in 1935 by John Wibberley. It was officially opened on 2 October 1935

A victim of declining popularity and neglect, the lido closed in 1992 but a vociferous local campaign led to a renovation, at a cost of £3.4 million, and Grade II Listed Building status in 1998. The facility re-opened to the public in 2005. During refurbishment the three tidal pools, pontoons and diving boards were all removed or filled in.

A lift and hoist were added in 2009 for disabled access.

Description
The lido design is a semicircle of  diameter.

The site comprises a concrete pool, counter-fort outer walls, reinforced concrete inner walls, duct walls and floors. The main building is reinforced with concrete and has some stone retaining walls. The semi-circular pool has projecting jetties, and at the entrance, there are circular cutwaters separated by steps. The changing rooms are in the art deco style and have square metal windows and a staircase. The pool has three fountains and is surrounded by cast-iron railings.

References

External links
Tinside Lido, Everyone Active
Tinside Lido, Visit Plymouth

Buildings and structures in Plymouth, Devon
Tourist attractions in Plymouth, Devon
Lidos
Swimming venues in England
Art Deco architecture in England
Buildings and structures completed in 1935